The 2014 UCI Road World Championships took place in Ponferrada, Spain, from 21 to 28 September 2014. The cycling championships consisted of 12 events for elite, under-23 and junior cyclists. It was the 81st UCI Road World Championships and the seventh time that Spain had hosted the championships; they were previously held in Lasarte in 1965, Montjuïc in 1973, Barcelona in 1984, Benidorm in 1992, San Sebastián in 1997 and Madrid in 2005.

Bidding process
The UCI announced on 4 April 2011 that the city of Ponferrada had the best candidature file to host the Championships. The candidature file of Ponferrada had the best score on the important sporting and economic elements. Ponferrada had unsuccessfully bid for the 2013 World Championships, which were awarded to Tuscany. Other candidates for the 2014 Championships were Hooglede-Gits in Belgium, Chihuahua in Mexico and the Vendée region in France.

Preparations

The original plan was to have two different finish sections, one for the road races and one for an uphill time trial. The idea was later discarded because it was not possible from a logistical and financial point of view.

Unpaid volunteers will perform a variety of tasks before and during the Championships. A target of 1000 volunteers was set with a maximum of 1400. When recruitment started begin April 2014, 200 applications were received within the first day. As of 16 September 1186 volunteers were recruited.

On 11 July the official anthem of the Championships was announced titled Song-G Ponferrada 2014 written by Bierzo band Rapabestas. Tickets for the Championships to sit near the finish line could be bought in advance. Day passes were available for €60–80 and special packages were available for more days. The Italian company Erreà was made responsible to develop and distribute the official merchandising, from which a percentage of sales will go towards funding the event.

Costs
The city council of Ponferrada estimated that at the end of April, €12.42 million had been spent on organizing the championships, an amount that could reach €14 million by the end of September. About €4.8 million comes from sponsors, merchandising and contributing hotels and several more millions will come from other contracts. The organization of championships has an overall budget of €11 million; organisers have to pay €5 million to the UCI for organizing the championships and €6 million are used for the organization and logistics. The Provincial Council of León invested €323,181 to upgrade Ponferrada and make the city ready for the championships.

According to media reports in March 2015, the championships failed to make a profit, with estimates for losses ranging from €2.7 to €9 million.

Qualification

Main qualification was based on performances on the UCI events during 2014. Results from January to the middle of August counted towards the qualification criteria, with the rankings being determined upon the release of the numerous tour rankings on 15 August 2014.

Participating nations

Cyclists from 68 national federations competed. Apart from these nations, one rider from Namibia competed in the men's team time trial. Rider from the Dominican Republic and Turkmenisten were registered but did not compete.
The number of cyclists per nation that competed, excluding riders in the team time trials, is shown in parentheses.

Schedule
All events will start and finish in Ponferrada. All times are in Central European Time (UTC+1).

Events summary

Elite events

Under-23 events

Junior events

Medal table

Courses

Team time trial
The team time trial starts in the centre of Ponferrada and will go via La Martina, Posada del Bierzo, Carracedelo and Cacabelos back to Ponferrada.

Individual time trial
The initial plan was to have a time trial finishing uphill. This idea was discarded because it was required to have two finish sections which was not possible from a logistical and financial point of view.

All courses will start and finish in Ponferrada and will run through La Martina, Posada del Bierzo and Carracedelo. A short stretch before riding into Ponferrada was made for the championships.

The course starts with a flat section of  through the valley of Bierzo, before the parcours goes slightly up. The ascent overlaps partly with the road race for men, which means the steepest part has a negative gradient of 16%. After  there is another climb. In a few kilometres the riders will reach the highest point in the route, located at  after . The rest of the course is going downhill.

Road race
The road races of all events will be on the same circuit.

The first  are flat, after which starts the climb to Alto de Montearenas with an average gradient of 8%. After a few hundred metres the ascent flattens and the remaining  are at an average gradient of 3.5%. Next is a descent, with the steepest after  with a 16% negative gradient.

Prize money
The UCI assigned premiums in all of the twelve events, with a total prize money of €179,805. In the individual time trials and road races the top 3 finishers win prize money and in the team time trials the top 5 teams.

The prize money in the road races is about twice as high as in the time trials for each category. About 60% of the prize money goes to the three elite men events and 28% to the elite women's. 61% of the prize money is awarded in the team time trials, 26% in the road races and 13% in the time trials.

Broadcasting

Africa (French speaking): BeIN Sports
Andorra: BeIN Sports
Australia: SBS Australia
Austria: ORF
Belgium: RTBF, VRT
Bosnia: SportKlub
Brazil: Globosat
Canada: RDS, Rogers Sportsnet
Croatia: SportKlub
Czech Republic: Czech TV
Denmark: Viasat
Estonia: Viasat
Finland: Viasat
France: France TV, BeIN Sports
Germany: Das Erste
Hungary: Sport 1
India: Sport 1
Israel: Charlton
Italy: RAI
Japan: NHK
Kosovo: SportKlub
Latvia: Viasat
Lithuania: Viasat
Macedonia: SportKlub
Malaysia: ASTRO
Mexico: SKY México
Middle East: Al Jazeera
Monaco: BeIN Sports
Montenegro: SportKlub
Netherlands: NOS
New-Zealand: Sky New-Zealand
Norway: Viasat
PAN Africa: SuperSport
PAN South America: Direct TV
Poland: Polsat
Portugal: RTP 2
Romania: Pro TV
Serbia: SportKlub
Slovakia: Slovak TV
Slovenia: SportKlub
Spain: TVE (international broadcast signal)
Sweden: Viasat
Switzerland: SRG SSR
United Kingdom: BBC Television
United States: Universal Sports
Worldwide: SNTV, Perform
Sources

See also
 2014 in men's road cycling
 2014 in women's road cycling

References

External links

 
Entries, Start Lists and Results on the UCI website

 
UCI Road World Championships by year
UCI Road World Championships
UCI Road World Championships
International cycle races hosted by Spain
Cycle races in Castile and León
September 2014 sports events in Europe